George Mann is the name of:

George Mann (cricketer) (1917–2001), English cricketer
George Mann (Minnesota politician) (1918–1984), member of the Minnesota House of Representatives
George Mann (rugby league) (born 1965), former professional rugby league footballer from Tonga
George Mann (vaudeville performer) (1905–1977), half of the comedic dance team of Barto and Mann
George Mann (writer) (born 1978), British author and editor
Sir Anthony Mann (judge) (George Anthony Mann, born 1951), judge of the High Court of England and Wales
George R. Mann (1856–1939), American architect